The Volleyball 2020–21 V.League Division 1 Women's is the 27th volleyball tournament year and the 3rd top level women's volleyball tournament of the newly branded and reorganized V.League (Japan). It is held from October 17, 2020 – February 21, 2021.

On August 4, 2020 the V.League Organization announced measures it has implemented to safeguard athletes, visitors, and related parties against the new coronavirus. Venues will be limited to 50% capacity and divided into three zones:
Zone 1: Competition-related area (athletes, referees, etc.)
Zone 2: Tournament management staff & press-related area
Zone 3: Customer area

The V. League Division 1 Women's V Cup will be held from February 27, 2021 to March 28, 2021. All twelve teams will participate but players who have been invited to the Japan women's national volleyball team will begin early training for the 2021 Olympics and will not participate in the V Cup.

The Empress' Cup Final Round is scheduled for December 11–20, 2020. The Prefecture and Block rounds were cancelled due to the COVID-19 pandemic in Japan.

The Kurowashiki All Japan Volleyball Tournament opens in May every year in Osaka and serves as the final competition of the season.

Clubs

Personnel

Foreign players
The number of foreign players is restricted to one per club world wide plus one per club from ASEAN nations.

Transfer players

Stadiums

Schedule 
Regular Round begins October 17, 2020 (Saturday) and ends February 21, 2021 (Sunday). Matches are played every Saturday and Sunday.

 Each team will play twenty-two matches
 Regular Season is a twelve team double round robin:
Round 1: October 17 to November 28, 2020
Round 2: December 4 to February 14, 2021
At the end of the Regular Round teams are ranked and divided into three groups of four teams each and will compete in the Final Stage. Teams are ranked in the Regular Round by:
Wins ->Points ->Set Percentage ->Scoring Rate

(Group 1) 1st–4th place
(Group 2) 5th–8th place
(Group 3) 9th–12th place

Final Stage will be held the weekend of February 20-21, 2021 (semi-finals and Finals for each group)

 Saturday, the 1st and 4th ranked team in each Group, and the 2nd and 3rd ranked team in each Group, will compete
 Sunday, the winners, and the losers, of Saturday's matches will compete for Final League Ranking
Group 1 is the semi-finals and Final of the League
Group 2 is jockeying for position (5th–8th) in the Final League Ranking
Group 3 is essentially the Challenge 4. Two losing teams will play the V.Challenge Match

V Cup
Qualifying round begins February 27, 2021 (Saturday) and ends March 21, 2021 (Sunday)

Teams are divided into two groups
 Group A: JT Marvelous, Okayama Seagulls, Denso Airybees, Toyota Auto Body Queenseis, Hisamitsu Springs,  Himeji Victorina
 Group B:  Saitama Ageo Medics, Toray Arrows, NEC Red Rockets, Hitachi Rivale, Kurobe AquaFairies, PFU BlueCats
Each group plays a single round robin
Final round will be held the weekend of March 27-28, 2021
Top two teams from each group play a semi-final
Winners will play a Final match

V.Challenge Match (V1-V2 Promotion-Relegation Matches): TBD

Season standing procedure 

Many matches were canceled this year due to the COVID-19 pandemic in Japan and the number of completed matches varied from team to team so the season standing procedure was changed from "number of matches won" to win rate percentage.

Tie Breakers are as follows:
If two or more teams have the same winning percentage, the team with the highest set rate will be ranked higher
If the set rate is also the same, the team with the highest scoring rate will be ranked higher
If the score rate is also the same, the teams are calculated and the top ranks are decided in the order of win rate, set rate, and score rate

Regular Round

Final standing

Individual Awards

Match Results

Round 1
Week 1

Week 2

Week 3

Week 4

Week 5

Week 6

Week 7

Round 2
Week 1

Week 2

Week 3

Week 4

Week 5

Week 6

Week 7

Final stage

 Final ranking matches: 1st to 4th place held on February 20 and 21, 2021 at  Ota Ward Gymnasium, Tokyo.

Match Results

 Final ranking matches: 5th-8th held on February 20 and 21, 2021 at  Saitama Budokan, Ageo  (ja).

Match Results

 Final ranking matches: 9th-12th held on February 20 and 21, 2021, in a remote match at  Ikenokawa Sakura Arena, Hitachi.

Match Results

Final standing

Awards

Regular Round 

 Best Scorer
  Jana Kulan (Toray Arrows)
 Best Spiker
  Haruyo Shimamura (NEC Red Rockets)
 Best Blocker
  Foluke Akinradewo (Hisamitsu Springs)
  Erika Araki (Toyota Auto Body Queenseis)
 Best Server
  Misaki Yamauchi (NEC Red Rockets)
 Best Receiver
  Mako Kobata (JT Marvelous)

V.League Special Award
For playing more than 10 seasons and more than 230 games:
 Haruyo Shimamura (NEC Red Rockets)
 Nana Iwasaka (Hisamitsu Springs)
 Yuki Ishii (Hisamitsu Springs)

V.League Distinguished Service Award 
For being active as a core player for 11 seasons and set a Japanese record (70.0%) in serve receive success rate:
 Risa Shinnabe  (Hisamitsu Springs)

Final stage 

 Most Valuable Player
 Mako Kobata (JT Marvelous)

 Best Six
 Sarina Koga (NEC Red Rockets)
 Jana Kulan (Toray Arrows)
 Haruyo Shimamura (NEC Red Rockets)
 Andrea Drews (JT Marvelous)
 Nanami Seki (Toray Arrows)
 Foluke Akinradewo (Hisamitsu Springs)

 Best Libero
 Mako Kobata (JT Marvelous)
 Receive Award
 Kotona Hayashi (JT Marvelous)
Fighting Spirit Award
 Ai Kurogo (Toray Arrows)
 Best Newcomer Award
 Mami Yokota (Denso Airybees)
 Fair Play Award
 Mizuki Tanaka (JT Marvelous)
 Director Award
 Tomoko Yoshihara (JT Marvelous)
 Matsudaira Yasutaka Award
  Tomoko Yoshihara (JT Marvelous)

V Cup

Qualifying round 

Twelve teams will be divided into two groups and a round-robin qualifying round will be held.

Group A:
JT Marvelous, Okayama Seagulls, Denso Airybees, Toyota Auto Body Queenseis, Hisamitsu Springs,  Himeji Victorina
Group B:
 Saitama Ageo Medics, Toray Arrows, NEC Red Rockets, Hitachi Rivale, Kurobe AquaFairies, PFU BlueCats

 The top two teams of each group (four teams in total) will perform the semifinal. The winners of the semifinals advance to the final, and the losers of the semifinal advance to the bronze-medal match.
 The ranking of the teams that do not advance to the final round will be determined by the results of the preliminary round: 5th, 7th, 9th and 11th. There will be no ranking match between group A and group B.
 The ranking of the qualifying round will be the team with the most wins.
 If there is a variation in the number of games played within the group, the team with the highest winning percentage will be ranked higher. 
 Tiebreakers are Set Rate, then Points Rate.
 In the event of a coronavirus positive person (including) of the participating team, or a refusal to participate due to any circumstances, the result is [0-25, 0-25, 0-25].
 If a team abstains for any reason, they will lose [0-25, 0-25, 0-25].

Results of the Qualifying Round

Match Results

Week 1

Week 2

Week 3

Final stage 
Held on March 27 and 28, 2021 at  Ota Ward Gymnasium, Tokyo.

Match Results

Final standing

V.Challenge Tournament

V1 11th vs. V2 2nd (two matches)
V1 12th vs. V2 1st (two matches)
If a V2 team does not have an S1 license, they will not play the tournament, and their V1 opponent remains in V1 unchallenged. 

Teams with the most wins will qualify for next season's V1 League. In the case of 1 win and 1 loss, the following will be used as tiebreakers:    
Points
Set rate
Score rate 

Points are awarded as follows:

V1/V2 V.Challenge Match Women's tournament held at Nagaoka Gymnasium on April 3 and 4, 2021.

 V1 Women's 11th - V2 Women's 2nd

|}
Match Results

 V1 Women's 12th - V2 Women's 1st

|}
Match Results

All Star Game
All Star game was not held this year.

See also
 2020–21 V.League Division 1 Men's

References

External links
 Official website 

V.Premier League Women
V.Premier League Women
Women's
2019 in Japanese sport
2020 in Japanese sport